The 1992 Arena Football League season was the sixth season of the Arena Football League (AFL). The league champions were the Detroit Drive, who defeated the Orlando Predators in ArenaBowl VI.

It is during the 1992 season that the first shutout in AFL history occurred.  On June 13, the Orlando Predators defeated the San Antonio Force by a score of 50–0.  To date, this remains the only shutout in AFL history, though there were other shutouts in the former AF2 after this. It also marked the first appearance of separate divisions in Arena football history.

Team movement
Five expansion teams joined the league: the Arizona Rattlers, Charlotte Rage, Cincinnati Rockers, Sacramento Attack, and the San Antonio Force.

Meanwhile, the Columbus Thunderbolts moved to Cleveland, Ohio and the Denver Dynamite suspended operations.

Standings

z – clinched homefield advantage

y – clinched division title

x – clinched playoff spot

Playoffs

Awards and honors

Regular season awards

All-Arena team

References